Charles of Sweden  may refer to:

 Charles VII of Sweden (circa 1130-1167), king (actually Charles I)
 Charles VIII of Sweden (1409–1470), king (actually Charles II)
 Charles IX of Sweden (1550–1611), king 
 Charles X Gustav of Sweden (1622–1660), king 
 Charles XI of Sweden (1655–1697), king 
 Charles XII of Sweden (1682–1718), king 
 Charles XIII of Sweden (1748–1818), king 
 Charles XIV John of Sweden (1763–1844), king 
 Charles XV of Sweden (1826–1872), king 
 Carl XVI Gustaf of Sweden (born 1946), king (actually never called Charles)
 Charles Philip, Duke of Södermanland (1601–1622), prince and duke
 Charles Frederick, Duke of Holstein-Gottorp (1700–1739), prince and heir presumptive
 Charles August, Crown Prince of Sweden (1768–1810), crown prince

Also see
 Carl of Sweden (disambiguation)